The 2003 North Dakota Fighting Sioux football team represented the University of North Dakota (UND) in the 2003 NCAA Division III football season. In Dale Lennon's fifth year as head coach, the team compiled a record of 12–2 overall and won the North Central Conference (NCC) title with a 7–0 mark. North Dakota was led on offense by two quarterbacks in Jon Bowenkamp and Joe Wilson, running back Adam Roland, and receivers Dan Grossman and Team-Voted MVP Willis Stattelman. Co-captain Digger Anderson was the leading tackler on defense. North Dakota lost to Grand Valley State in the final of the NCAA Division II Football Championship, a reverse of the 2001 result.

Schedule

Game summaries

Minnesota–Crookston
In the season opener against the Minnesota–Crookston Eagles the Sioux dominated. They scored forty-two second-quarter points and six players scored as they won fifty-nine to nothing.

At Mesa State
The Sioux stumbled at Mesa St. The Mavs took an early twenty-one–to–seven lead and took that led into halftime. UND fought back and got within seventeen to twenty-four. Finally with eighteen seconds left Adam Roland ran through for a one-yard touchdown to send the game to overtime. However, the Sioux could not score in overtime as they lost thirty-one to twenty-four.

Newberry
In the third game of the season the Sioux tore apart the Newberry Indians. UND dominated early and often and the Indians could not stop the Sioux and took a forty-two–to–nine fourth quarter lead. The Indians did score two touchdowns to make it respectable as the Sioux won forty-two to twenty-three.

Augustana (SD)
In the 2003 homecoming game UND battled the Augustana Vikings. In the first quarter Travis Lueck returned a blocked punt fifty-one yards to give the Sioux a six-to-nothing lead. After Augustana made it six to three in the fourth quarter the Sioux put it away as Dan Grossman scored on a thirty-six yard pass from Jon Bowenkamp and UND won thirteen to three.

St. Cloud State
The next week against the St. Cloud State Huskies UND came out flatter than water. St. Cloud took a twenty-eight–to–three halftime lead. At halftime UND coach Dale Lennon switched quarterbacks putting in sixth-year senior Joe Wilson. The first play of the second half Brandon Strouth threw a sixty-one yard pass to Willis Stattelman on a halfback pass. Willis Stattelman scored two more fourth quarter touchdowns and got within twenty-eight to twenty-six. As time ran out the Sioux had one chance as kicker Jeff Glas attempted a fifty-two yard field goal. The kick went through, giving the Sioux the improbable win.

At South Dakota State
When UND went to South Dakota St., the Sioux faced similar difficulties falling, behind twenty-one to three at halftime. At halftime Dale Lennon undid the previous week's quarterback switch, putting Jon Bowenkamp back in. With six minutes left Bowenkamp found Jesse Ahlers in the end zone to make it twenty-four to seventeen. Then with two seconds left Bowenkamp found Ahlers in the end zone again for a ten-yard touchdown. The Sioux chose to go for the win. Bowenkamp went back to pass and fired the ball in the end zone, the ball was tipped and Willis Stattelman sprawled out to catch the ball and give UND the win.

North Dakota State
The next week UND went to play the NDSU Bison, their instate rival in the final Nickel Trophy game as the Bison were going up to Division I-AA. With under ten minutes left in the fourth quarter Travis Lueck caught his second touchdown of over fifty yards to give UND a twenty-one–to–seven lead. NDSU would then come back and tie the game with ten seconds left in regulation. In overtime after a Caleb Johnson touchdown NDSU had to score and had a third down and one when Digger Anderson made a key stop and then made a fourth down stop to give the win to the Sioux.

At Minnesota State–Mankato
The next week at Mankato the Sioux ran away from the Mavs as Aaron Schwenzfeier ran for one hundred forty-three yards and Travis Lueck had one hundred thirty-five yards receiving in the forty-one to twenty-five win.

Nebraska–Omaha
In this game UND would blow a thirty-five to twenty-one lead. After UNO tied the game at thirty-five UND got the ball with two minutes left. Travis Lueck followed the ball early in the drive and the Mavs went for a field goal attempt. The kick was shanked though giving UND a final chance. The Sioux were led down the field by Jon Bowenkamp and finished off as Jeff Glas kicked a game winning forty-eight yard field goal.

At South Dakota
In the season finale UND ran away from the Coyotes led by Roland's ninety-eight yards rushing and Jesse Ahlers one hundred forty-three receiving yards as UND won thirty-seven to three.

Pittsburg State
In the playoff opener UND shut down the Gorillas. Adam Roland ran for one hundred sixty-eight yards and Dan Grossman scored a touchdown from Joe Wilson as UND won twenty-four to fourteen.

Winona State
In the quarterfinals the Sioux dominated the second quarter against the Warriors taking a twenty-eight–to–seven lead. The Warriors came back though and took a twenty-nine to twenty-eight fourth quarter lead. With twenty-four second left Adam Roland punched in a one-yard touchdown that was set up by several Willis Stattelman catches. The win sent UND to the Semi finals.

North Alabama
The Sioux shut down the Lions no huddle offense at home as the Lions could not here in the Alerus Center. UND jumped to a nineteen-to-three halftime lead. North Alabama came back but the Sioux won twenty-nine to twenty-two victory.

Grand Valley State
The season came down to the 2001 national championship game rematch as the Grand Valley St. Lakers took on the North Dakota Fighting Sioux. UND could not do anything and Jeff Glas missed three field goals. Down ten to three, the Sioux had one final chance near the goal line. Jon Bowenkamp was looking for Stattlemen in the end zone but the pass was picked off and Grand Valley finished off the repeat.

References

North Dakota
North Dakota Fighting Hawks football seasons
North Central Conference football champion seasons
North Dakota Fighting Sioux football